Ramanuja (Middle Tamil: Rāmāṉujam; Classical Sanskrit: Rāmanuja;  1017 CE – 1137 CE;), also known as Ramanujacharya, was an Indian Hindu philosopher, guru and a social reformer. He is noted to be one of the most important exponents of the Sri Vaishnavism tradition within Hinduism. His philosophical foundations for devotionalism were influential to the Bhakti movement.

Ramanuja's guru was Yādava Prakāśa, a scholar who according to tradition belonged to the Advaita Vedānta tradition, but probably was a Bhedabheda scholar. Sri Vaishnava tradition holds that Ramanuja disagreed with his guru and the non-dualistic Advaita Vedānta, and instead followed in the footsteps of Tamil Alvārs tradition, the scholars Nāthamuni and Yamunāchārya. Ramanuja is famous as the chief proponent of Vishishtadvaita subschool of Vedānta, and his disciples were likely authors of texts such as the Shatyayaniya Upanishad. Ramanuja himself wrote influential texts, such as bhāsya on the Brahma Sutras and the Bhagavad Gita, all in Sanskrit.

His Vishishtadvaita (qualified non-dualism) philosophy has competed with the Dvaita (theistic dualism) philosophy of Madhvāchārya, and Advaita (non-dualism) philosophy of Ādi Shankara, together the three most influential Vedantic philosophies of the 2nd millennium. Ramanuja presented the epistemic and soteriological importance of bhakti, or the devotion to a personal God (Vishnu in Ramanuja's case) as a means to spiritual liberation. His theories assert that there exists a plurality and distinction between Ātman (soul) and Brahman (metaphysical, ultimate reality), while he also affirmed that there is unity of all souls and that the individual soul has the potential to realize identity with the Brahman.

Biography 

Ramanuja was born into a Tamil Brahmin community, in a village called Sriperumbudur (present-day Tamil Nadu) under the Chola Empire. His followers in the Vaishnava tradition wrote hagiographies, some of which were composed in centuries after his death, and which the tradition believes to be true.

The traditional hagiographies of Ramanuja state he was born to mother Kānthimathi and father Asuri Keshava Somayāji, in Sriperumbudur, near modern Chennai, Tamil Nādu. He is believed to have been born in the month of Chithirai under the star Tiruvadhirai. They place his life in the period of 1017–1137 CE, yielding a lifespan of 120 years. These dates have been questioned by modern scholarship, based on temple records and regional literature of 11th- and 12th-century outside the Sri Vaishnava tradition, and modern era scholars suggest that Ramanuja may have lived in 1077–1157 CE.

Ramanuja married, moved to Kānchipuram, and studied with Yādava Prakāśa as his guru. Ramanuja and his guru frequently disagreed in interpreting Vedic texts, particularly the Upanishads. Ramanuja and Yādava Prakāśa separated, and thereafter Ramanuja continued his studies on his own.

He attempted to meet another famed Vedanta scholar of 11th-century Yamunāchārya, but Sri Vaishnava tradition holds that the latter died before the meeting and they never met. Ramanuja was the great-grandson of Yamunāchārya through a granddaughter. However, some hagiographies assert that the corpse of Yamunāchārya miraculously rose and named Ramanuja as the new leader of Sri Vaishnava sect previously led by Yamunāchārya. One hagiography states that after leaving Yādava Prakāśa, Ramanuja was initiated into Sri Vaishnavism by Periya Nambi, also called Mahapurna, another Vedānta scholar. Ramanuja renounced his married life, and became a Hindu monk. However, states Katherine Young, the historical evidence on whether Ramanuja led a married life or he did renounce and became a monk is uncertain.

Ramanuja became a priest at the Varadharāja Perumal temple (Vishnu) at Kānchipuram, where he began to teach that moksha (liberation and release from samsara) is to be achieved not with metaphysical, nirguna Brahman but with the help of personal god and saguna Vishnu. Ramanuja has long enjoyed foremost authority in the Sri Vaishnava tradition.

Hagiographies
The  by Brahmatantra Svatantra Jīyar represents the earliest  biography, and reflects the  view of the succession following Ramanuja. , on the other hand, represents the Tenkalai biography. Other late biographies include the Yatirajavaibhavam by Andhrapurna.

Historical background 
Ramanuja grew up in the Tamil culture, in a stable society during the rule of the Chola dynasty. This period was one of pluralistic beliefs, where Vaishnava, Shaiva, Smarta traditions, Buddhism and Jainism thrived together. In Hindu monastic tradition, Advaita Vedānta had been dominant, and Ramanuja's guru Yādava Prākāsha belonged to this tradition. Prior to Ramanuja, the Sri Vaishnava sampradaya was already an established organization under Yamunāchārya, and bhakti songs and devotional ideas already a part of Tamil culture because of the twelve Alvārs. Ramanuja's fame grew because he was considered the first thinker in centuries that disputed Shankara's theories, and offered an alternative interpretation of Upanishadic scriptures.

Early life
When Ramanuja and his guru Yadava Prakaasa parted ways due to their differences in interpreting the Vedic literature, Ramanuja became a devotee of the Varadaraja Perumal temple in Kanchi. During this period, Ramanuja's discourses and fame reached far and wide. Yamunacharya, the Vaishnavite acharya and the religious head of the Ranganathasamy temple at Srirangam had been closely following Ramanuja from a very young age. When it was time to pass on the legacy, the acharya decided that he would call upon Ramanuja. Accordingly, he summoned Sri Mahapurna, a disciple who was helping him out with the temple affairs and asked him to go to Kanchi and bring Ramanuja.

When Mahapurna met Ramanuja and informed him of his guru's desire, Ramanuja was overjoyed and they both immediately left for Srirangam. But bad news awaited them at Srirangam and they both learned that Yamunacharya had died. Heart-broken, Ramanuja then left for Kanchi and refused to worship Sri Ranganatha for he held him responsible for taking away Yamunacharya from this world. As for Mahapurna, he began to assist Tiruvaranga Araiyar, the son of Yamunacharya in managing the temple affairs. But as time passed by, Tiruvaranga Araiyar and other senior members of the Vaishnavite order felt that there was a vacuum after Yamunacharya's demise and that they lacked a person who could interpret the Vedas and Sastras like Yamunacharya. So it was finally decided that Sri Mahapurna should once again go and invite Ramanuja to Srirangam.

Meanwhile, in Kanchi, Ramanuja met with Kanchipurna, a fellow devotee, regularly and soon decided that he would become Kanchipurna's disciple. When he approached Kanchipurna about this, Kanchipurna politely refused as he did not belong to the same caste as Ramanuja and told him that he would get a more appropriate guru. After this Kanchipurna left for Tirupati to worship Lord Venkateswara and would return only after six months. When he finally came back, it was through him that Lord Varadaraja conveyed his wish to Ramanuja. Accordingly, Kanchipurna advised Ramanuja that it was the Lord's wish that he leave for Srirangam and find solace in Sri Mahapurna.

Induction into Vaishnavism

After it was decided that Mahapurna would go and invite Ramanuja to Srirangam, the acharya left for Kanchi with his wife. While on his way to Kanchi, Mahapurna and his wife decided to take some rest at Maduranthakam, a place that is located 40 km from present day Chennai. As fate would have it Ramanuja, who was on his way to Srirangam, arrived at the same place and to his joy found Mahapurna. They soon embraced each other and Ramanuja requested that he waste no time in initiating him into the Vaishnavite order. Mahapurna immediately obliged and Ramanuja received the Panchasamskaras (the five sacraments).

Persecution
Some hagiographies, composed centuries after Ramanuja died, state that a Chola king, Kulothunga II, had immense hatred towards Sri Vaishnavism. He was called Kirimikanta Chola or worm-necked Chola, so called as the king is said to have suffered from the cancer of the neck or throat. Historian Nilakanta Sastri identifies Krimikanta Chola with Adhirajendra Chola or Virarajendra Chola with whom the main line (Vijayalaya line) ended. Knowing the evil intentions of the king, Sri Rāmānujā's disciple, Sri Koorathazhwan persuaded Ramanuja to leave the Chola kingdom. Sri Rāmānujā then moved to Hoysala kingdom for 14 years, wherein he converted a Jain king, Bitti Deva to Hinduism after miraculously healing his daughter. Bitti Deva changed his name to Vishnuvardhana. King Vishnuvardhana assisted Sri Rāmānujā to build a temple of Lord Thirunarayanaswamy at Melukote which is presently a temple town in Mandya district of Karnataka. Rāmānujā later returned on his own to Tamil Nādu after the demise of Krimikanta Chola. According to Sastri, Krimikanta or Adhirajendra Chola was killed in a local uprising of the Vaishnavas.

According to "Koil Olugu" (temple records) of the Srirangam temple, Kulottunga III was the son of Krimikanta Chola or Karikala Chola. The former, unlike his father, is said to have been a repentant son who supported Vaishnavism. Ramanuja is said to have made Kulottunga III as a disciple of his nephew, Dasarathi. The king then granted the management of the Ranganathaswamy temple to Dasarathi and his descendants as per the wish of Ramanuja. Some historians hold that Krimikanta, the persecutor of Ramanuja had a personal animosity towards Ramanuja and did not persecute Vaishnavites.

Reformation
The Sri Vaishnavite order prior to Ramanuja was not averse to people from other castes as both Kanchipurna and Mahapurna were non-Brahmins. So when Ramanuja revolted against the discrimination that had crept within the caste system, he was simply following the same lines as the Alwars and helped the people who were considered to be untouchables (dasa, dasulu, dasu), to get absorbed into the Sri Vaishnava Bhakthi Movement, encouraging them to attain Spiritual enlightenment by teaching them Sri Alwar Divyaprabandham. He called these downtrodden classes as Tirukulattar, meaning "of noble descent" in Tamil, and was instrumental in admitting them into the temple in Melukote. Ramanuja's liberal views also led to the reorganization of rituals in Srirangam and the involvement of non-Brahmin people in the Vaishnava worship. This policy change contributed to the enhancement of social status for artisanal and other non-Brahmin caste groups, especially the weavers (SenguntharKaikola Mudaliyar) who were one of the chief beneficiaries. After the period of Ramanuja, the Sri Vaishnava community split on this issue and formed the Vadakalai (northern and Sanskritic) and Thenkalai (southern and Tamil) sects. Both sects believe in initiation into Sri Vaishnavism through Pancha Samskara. This ceremony or rite of passage is necessary for one to become a Sri Vaishnava Brahmin. It is performed by Brahmins and non-Brahmins in order to become Vaishnavas.

Attempts on Ramanuja's life 

There were multiple attempts on Ramanuja's life. When he was a student under Yadava Prakasa, the latter grew jealous of Ramanuja's rise to fame. So Yadava Prakasa tried to get rid of Ramanuja during a tour to the Ganges in northern India. Govinda, Ramanuja's cousin (son of his mother's sister), learned of this plot and warned Ramanuja who then left the group and escaped to Kanchi with the help of an elderly hunter couple. Later Yadava Prakasa realised his folly and became a disciple under Ramanuja.

Later another attempt was made on Ramanuja's life while he was about to take charge of the temple affairs in Srirangam. The head priest of the Ranganathaswamy Temple, Srirangam did not like Ramanuja and decided to kill him. Accordingly, he invited Ramanuja to his house for having food and planned to kill him by poisoning his food. However, when Ramanuja arrived, the priest's wife saw the divine glow of Ramanuja and immediately confessed her husband's plan. This did not deter the priest who then made another attempt when Ramanuja visited the temple. He poisoned the temple Theertham(holy water) and served it to Ramanuja. However instead of dying Ramanuja began to dance with joy. The priest taken aback at once realised his mistake and fell at the feet of Ramanuja.

Writings 
The Sri Vaisnava tradition attributes nine Sanskrit texts to Ramanuja – Vedārthasangraha (literally, "Summary" of the "Vedas meaning"), Sri Bhāshya (a review and commentary on the Brahma Sutras), Bhagavad Gita Bhāshya (a review and commentary on the Bhagavad Gita), and the minor works titled Vedāntadipa, Vedāntasāra, Gadya Trayam (which is a compilation of three texts called the Saranāgati Gadyam, Sriranga Gadyam and the Srivaikunta Gadyam), and Nitya Grantham.

Some scholars have questioned the authenticity of the majority of his work but the three of the largest works credited to Ramanuja – Shri Bhāshya, Vedārthasangraha and the Bhagavad Gita Bhāshya.

Philosophy

Ramanuja's philosophical foundation was qualified monism, and is called Vishishtadvaita in the Hindu tradition. His ideas are one of three subschools in Vedānta, the other two are known as Ādi Shankara's Advaita (absolute monism) and Madhvāchārya's Dvaita (dualism).

Rāmānuja’s Epistemology 
Rāmānuja's epistemology is hyperrealistic or similar to naïve empiricism. The first two sources of knowledge are perception and inference, and they are trustworthy notwithstanding general human subjection to "beginningless ignorance." Knowledge is always of the real, even in dreams, and error is a disordered perception or faulty inference concerning what is really there. The third source of knowledge is the testimony of scripture, or more strictly, śabda ("eternal sound"), which helps to establish much that is uncertain on the basis of sense perception and inference, notably the existence and nature of the ultimate reality (brahman ). Though unlike some proponents of naïve empiricism, Rāmānuja does not think that it suffices to intermittently have an acquaintance with objects of knowledge. Knowledge (jñāna) only occurs when there is direct perception of an object. Unlike proper empiricists, Rāmānuja does not restrict knowledge to that which can be gathered from the senses. Rāmānuja was unique in his view that bhakti or devotion is itself an epistemic state. He says that when bhakti takes firm root in an individual, it turns into parabhakti, which is the highest form of bhakti and that bhakti is the direct awareness of Brahman's nature and thus is a kind of knowledge (jñāna).

Rāmānuja’s Soteriology 
According to Rāmānuja, the greatest good consists of knowing our true nature and of knowing the true nature of Brahman. Moksha, or spiritual liberation, is seen as the joy of contemplating Brahman (rather than release from the life-death-rebirth cycle), and that joy is the result of devotion, praise, worship and contemplating the divine perfection. Knowledge of Brahman consists in liberation, for Rāmānuja, mainly because of the character of Brahman. He writes:"Entities other than Brahman can be objects of such cognitions of the nature of joy only to a finite extent and for limited duration. But Brahman is such that cognizing of him is an infinite and abiding joy. It is for this reason that the śruti [scripture] says, `Brahman is bliss’ (Taittirīya Upaniṣad II.6.) Since the form of cognition as joy is determined by its object, Brahman itself is joy."Rāmānuja is explicit in holding that theoretical knowledge of Brahman‘s nature will not suffice to procure liberation. The remedy to be employed, according Rāmānuja, is what he calls bhakti yoga, or the discipline of devotion or worship. For Ramanuja, liberation (moksha) is not a negative separation from transmigration, or a series of rebirths, but rather the joy of the contemplating the divine perfection. This joy is attained by a life of exclusive devotion (bhakti) to Brahman, singing his praise, performing adulatory acts in temple and private worship, and constantly dwelling on his perfections. In return, Brahman will offer his grace, which will assist the devotee in gaining release.

Criticism of Sankara 
Ramanuja argued that Shankara's interpretation of the Upanishads had serious errors. His major objections were fourfold: (1) He argued that Brahman was differentiated consciousness and not undifferentiated consciousness; (2) He argued that Shankara's concept of Nirguna Brahman was wrong and untenable; (3) He argued that beginningless karma, and not superimposition, was the cause of avidya; and (4) He rejected Sankara's doctrine of Avidya (Ignorance) and Maya (Illusion) on the basis that it had seven major flaws and inconsistencies.

Hermeneutic Criticism

Vedas as Doctrinally Unified Corpus 
Ramanuja accepted that the Vedas are a reliable source of knowledge, then critiqued other schools of Hindu philosophy, including Advaita Vedānta, as having failed in interpreting all of the Vedic texts. He asserted, in his Sri Bhāshya, that purvapaksin (previous schools) selectively interpret those Upanishadic passages that support their monistic interpretation, and ignore those passages that support the pluralism interpretation. There is no reason, stated Ramanuja, to prefer one part of a scripture and not other, the whole of the scripture must be considered on par. One cannot, according to Ramanuja, attempt to give interpretations of isolated portions of any scripture. Rather, the scripture must be considered one integrated corpus, expressing a consistent doctrine. The Vedic literature, asserted Ramanuja, mention both plurality and oneness, therefore the truth must incorporate pluralism and monism, or qualified monism.

This method of scripture interpretation distinguishes Ramanuja from Ādi Shankara. Shankara's exegetical approach Samanvayat Tatparya Linga with Anvaya-Vyatireka, states that for proper understanding all texts must be examined in their entirety and then their intent established by six characteristics, which includes studying what is stated by the author to be his goal, what he repeats in his explanation, then what he states as his conclusion and whether it can be epistemically verified. Not everything in any text, states Shankara, has equal weight and some ideas are the essence of any expert's textual testimony. This philosophical difference in scriptural studies helped Shankara conclude that the Principal Upanishads primarily teach monism with teachings such as Tat tvam asi, while helping Ramanuja conclude that qualified monism is at the foundation of Hindu spirituality.

Comparison with other Vedānta schools 

Ramanuja's Vishishtadvaita shares the theistic devotionalism ideas with Madhvāchārya's Dvaita. Both schools assert that Jīva (human souls) and Brahman (as Vishnu) are different, a difference that is never transcended. God Vishnu alone is independent, all other gods and beings are dependent on Him, according to both Madhvāchārya and Ramanuja. However, in contrast to Madhvāchārya's views, Ramanuja asserts "qualified non-dualism", that souls share the same essential nature of Brahman, and that there is a universal sameness in the quality and degree of bliss possible for human souls, and every soul can reach the bliss state of God Himself. While the 13th- to 14th-century Madhavāchārya asserted both "qualitative and quantitative pluralism of souls", Ramanuja asserted "qualitative monism and quantitative pluralism of souls", states Sharma.

Ramanuja's Vishishtadvaita school and Shankara's Advaita school are both nondualistic Vedānta schools, both are premised on the assumption that all souls can hope for and achieve the state of blissful liberation; in contrast, Madhvāchārya believed that some souls are eternally doomed and damned. Shankara's theory posits that only Brahman and causes are metaphysical unchanging reality, while the empirical world (Maya) and observed effects are changing, illusive and of relative existence. Spiritual liberation to Shankara is the full comprehension and realization of oneness of one's unchanging Ātman (soul) as the same as Ātman in everyone else as well as being identical to the nirguna Brahman. In contrast, Ramanuja's theory posits both Brahman and the world of matter are two different absolutes, both metaphysically real, neither should be called false or illusive, and saguna Brahman with attributes is also real. God, like man, states Ramanuja, has both soul and body, and all of the world of matter is the glory of God's body. The path to Brahman (Vishnu), asserted Ramanuja, is devotion to godliness and constant remembrance of the beauty and love of personal god (saguna Brahman, Vishnu).

Influence 

Harold Coward describes Ramanuja as "the founding interpreter of Sri Vaisnavite scripture." Wendy Doniger calls him "probably the single most influential thinker of devotional Hinduism". J. A. B. van Buitenen states that Ramanuja was highly influential, by giving "bhakti an intellectual basis", and his efforts made bhakti the major force within different traditions of Hinduism.

Modern scholars have compared the importance of Ramanuja in Hinduism to that of scholar Thomas Aquinas (1225–1274) in Western Christianity.

Ramanuja reformed the Srirangam Ranganathaswamy temple complex, undertook India-wide tours and expanded the reach of his organization. The temple organization became the stronghold of his ideas and his disciples. It is here that he wrote his influential Vishishtadvaita philosophy text, Sri Bhashyam, over a period of time.

Ramanuja not only developed theories and published philosophical works, he organized a network of temples for Vishnu-Lakshmi worship. Ramanuja set up centers of studies for his philosophy during the 11th and 12th centuries, by traveling through India in that era, and these influenced generations of poet saints devoted to the Bhakti movement. Regional traditions assert that his visits, debates and discourses triggered conversion of Jains and Buddhists to Vaishnavism in Mysore and Deccan region.

The birthplace of Ramanuja near Chennai hosts a temple and is an active Vishishtadvaita school. His doctrines inspire a lively intellectual tradition in southern, northern and eastern states of India, his monastery and temple traditions are carried on in the most important and large Vaishnava centres – the Ranganātha temple in Srirangam, Tamil Nadu, and the Venkateswara Temple, Tirumala in Tirupati, Andhra Pradesh.

The Statue of Equality in Hyderabad, planned by Chinna Jeeyar, is dedicated to Ramanuja. It was inaugurated by Indian Prime Minister Narendra Modi on 5 February 2022.

Names

 'Ilayazhwar' by Periya Thirumalai Nambi
 'Boodha Puriser' by Sriperumbudur Adikesava Perumal
 'Am Mudalvan Evan' by Yamunāchārya
 'Ethirajar' and 'Ramanuja Muni' by Kanchi Perarulala Perumal
 'Udayavar' by Srirangam Periya Perumal
 'Emperumanar' by Tirukozhtiyur Nambi
 'Tiruppavai Jeeyar' by Periya Nambi
 'Lakshmana Muni' by Tiruvaranga Perumal Arayar
 'Sadagopan Ponnadi' by Tirumalaiyandan
 'Sri Bashyakarar' by Kalaimagal
 'Desi Kendiran' by Tirupathi Thiruvenkatamudayan
 'Koil Annan' by Srivilliputhur Kothai Nachiyar

See also
Adi Shankarar
Ramanujacharya
Ramanujar
Hindu philosophy
Subala Upanishad – a minor Upanishad repeatedly cited by Ramanuja, and influential to his ideas
Yoga (philosophy)
Vishnuvardhana

Notes

References

Sources

External links

Biographies
 Biography and works, The Internet encyclopaedia of Philosophy
 Biography of Ramanuja, Sanskrit.org

Works
 Rāmānuja Biography, Surendranath Dasgupta, 1940
 Rāmānuja Literature, Surendranath Dasgupta, 1940
 Bibliography of Ramanuja's works, Item 637, Karl Potter, University of Washington
 Sri Bhashya: 's commentary on Vedanta Sutras, translated By George Thibaut (1904)
 
 

Others
 Ramanuja.org

1010s births
1137 deaths
12th-century Indian philosophers
11th-century Indian philosophers
Indian Vaishnavites
Sri Vaishnava religious leaders
Indian centenarians
People from Kanchipuram district
Vedanta
Vishishtadvaita Vedanta
Vaishnava saints
Medieval Hindu religious leaders
Scholars from Chennai
Ancient Indian philosophers
Longevity claims
Indian Hindu spiritual teachers
Brahmins
Tamil Hindu saints
Brahmins who fought against discrimination
Anti-caste activists
Indian reformers
Hindu reformers